Ruth Mary Tristram (25 April 1886 – 22 October 1950) was a British amateur botanist.

Life
Born Ruth Mary Cardew on 25 April 1886, married Major Guy H. Tristram (-1963) in 1919, they had four children.  They lived at (the now listed) Cox's Mill, Dallington.  Son Launcelot died aged eight, and Tristram attempted to communicate with him by automatic writing.  Son Christopher Guy (3 August 1925 – 1943) was killed when the Valaaren was sunk by German submarine U-229 after leaving convoy HX231 (the "Crisis Convoy").  Son David became a noted helleborist. Ruth Mary Tristram died on 22 October 1950.

Botany
Tristram became an expert on Plantago and was elected a fellow of the Linnean Society on 7 December 1911. She worked with E. G. Barker on Plantago with a plan to publish an account in for Cambridge British Flora. They published several papers together. Tristram was also a member of the Wild Flower Society.

Works

Botanical
 With E. G. Baker: papers in Report of the Botanical Society and Journal of Botany

Spiritual
 Letters from Lancelot, Dallington, (1931), (aka Lancelot, etc. Letters received in automatic writing by R. M. T.) consisting of automatic writings and other materials relating to her dead son Lancelot, and other matters. (Reprinted 1933, by Dunston.)
 Letters from Christopher : Born August 3rd. 1925. Died at sea April 1943 (1944)
 Christopher, etc. [Letters received in automatic writing by R.M.T. "by CHRISTOPHER" (1947)
 A Book of Preparation for the Coming Light as R.M.T.  (1951)
 The Book of Comfort by R. M. Tristram (1957)

Bibliography
 J. W. Cardew and J. E. Lously, [Obituary] Ruth Mary Tristram in Watsonia 2 (1951): 139

References

1880s births
1950 deaths
British botanists
Fellows of the Linnean Society of London
British spiritualists
People from Rother District